Élie Fruchart (8 July 1922 – 1 July 2003) was a French football player who played with US Auchel. He was born in Calonne-Ricouart. He has also managed US Auchel, RC Lens, Stade de Reims, USL Dunkerque and Angers SCO.

References

Profile

1922 births
2003 deaths
French footballers
French football managers
RC Lens managers
Stade de Reims managers
Angers SCO managers
Association football goalkeepers
USL Dunkerque managers